Teekaram Rajcoomar (born 13 March 1964) is a Mauritian boxer. He competed in the men's bantamweight event at the 1988 Summer Olympics.

References

1964 births
Living people
Mauritian male boxers
Olympic boxers of Mauritius
Boxers at the 1988 Summer Olympics
Place of birth missing (living people)
Bantamweight boxers